Holy Ghost People may refer to:
 Holy Ghost People (1967 film), a documentary by Peter Adair
 Holy Ghost People (2013 film), a film by Mitchell Altieri partially inspired by Adair's documentary film